Michele Mary Brown (née Mason; born 3 July 1939) is an Australian athlete, who competed mainly in the high jump during her career.

She competed for Australia at the 1964 Summer Olympics held in Tokyo, Japan where she won the silver medal in the women's high jump event. She was the second female athlete ever to jump over six feet, after Iolanda Balaș.

Brown was inducted into the Athletics Australia Hall of Fame in 2010.

References

External links

1939 births
Living people
Australian female high jumpers
Olympic athletes of Australia
Olympic silver medalists for Australia
Athletes (track and field) at the 1956 Summer Olympics
Athletes (track and field) at the 1964 Summer Olympics
Commonwealth Games gold medallists for Australia
Commonwealth Games medallists in athletics
Athletes (track and field) at the 1958 British Empire and Commonwealth Games
Athletes (track and field) at the 1962 British Empire and Commonwealth Games
Athletes (track and field) at the 1966 British Empire and Commonwealth Games
Medalists at the 1964 Summer Olympics
Olympic silver medalists in athletics (track and field)
Medallists at the 1966 British Empire and Commonwealth Games
Medallists at the 1958 British Empire and Commonwealth Games
Medallists at the 1962 British Empire and Commonwealth Games
20th-century Australian women